The tzykanisterion was a stadium for playing the tzykanion (the Greek name for Chovgan, from Middle Persian čaukān, čōkān), a kind of polo adopted by the Byzantines from Sassanid Persia.

History
According to John Kinnamos (263.17–264.11), the tzykanion was played by two teams on horseback, equipped with long sticks topped by nets, with which they tried to push an apple-sized leather ball into the opposite team's goal. The sport was very popular among the Byzantine nobility: Emperor Basil I (r. 867–886) excelled at it; his son, Emperor Alexander (r. 912–913), died from exhaustion while playing, Emperor Alexios I Komnenos (r. 1081–1118) was injured while playing with Tatikios, and John I of Trebizond (r. 1235–1238) died from an injury during a game.

The Great Palace of Constantinople featured a tzykanisterion, first built by Emperor Theodosius II (r. 408–450) on the southeastern part of the palace precinct. It was demolished by Basil I in order to erect the Nea Ekklesia church in its place, and rebuilt in larger size further east, connected to the Nea with two galleries. Aside from Constantinople and Trebizond, other Byzantine cities also featured tzykanisteria, most notably Lacedaemonia, Ephesus, and Athens, something which modern scholars interpret as an indication of a thriving urban aristocracy. 

These were also used as places of public tortures and executions, as it is historically recorded for the tzykanisteria of Constantinople and Ephesus.

References

Sources

Great Palace of Constantinople
Polo venues
Roman–Iranian relations
Polo in Europe
Polo in Asia